Margiste is an Estonian surname. Notable people with the surname include:

Aleksander Margiste (1908–1988), Estonian basketball player
Anne Margiste (born 1942), Estonian actress

Estonian-language surnames